The OAED Vocational College shooting was a school shooting that occurred on April 10, 2009, at the Manpower Employment Organisation of Greece (OAED)‛s vocational training school OAED (Greek: Σχολή Μαθητείας) in Agios Ioannis Rentis suburb, Athens, Greece, during which a gunman shot one student and two civilians before fatally shooting himself in a nearby park. The gunman was a 19-year-old year student, a greek immigrant from Abkhazia, a region of the country Georgia, Dimitris Patmanidis (Greek: Δημήτρης Πατμανίδης) who was studying car electrics at the school. It is the only incident of school shooting to occur in Greece so far.

Shooting
At 8:30 a.m. UTC+3, about fifteen minutes after the beginning of the lessons, Dimitris Patmanidis arrived at the building housing the OAED vocational school armed with two loaded handguns, which were modified replicas of sound pistols which have been converted into firearms, and a hunting knife. Inside the building Patmanidis approached 18-year-old student Dimitris Kokkinis, who had arrived late to school, and shot him three times.

Patmanidis then turned to leave the school and was confronted by two workers from a nearby technical company who were alerted by the gunfire. They asked him what has happened and he shot both of them, from a 150m distance. The gunman then ran to a nearby park where he attempted suicide by shooting himself in the head. He was carried in a critical condition to the Nikaia General Hospital where he later died.

The 18-year-old student Dimitris Kokkinis, who was shot three times in the chest, leg, and hand, was carried in a serious condition to the Nikaia General Hospital, where he was prolongly operated. The two others were slightly injured, the one in the hand and the other in the leg. During the assault, the gunman shot 15 bullets of the 83 he had in the pistols, his pockets and his bag, before the assault.

Motive
According to a police spokesman "It seems his motive was revenge." The police also estimates that his act was planned.
A note found in Patmanidis's bag after the incident said that he couldn't take any more the rejection he felt. A friend of Patmanidis, said he was tired of being mocked by other pupils, for his styled appearance and behaviour.

 
His act was announced in his page at MySpace with a brief note same to that found in his bag. In his profile also, Patmanidis had posted photos of him posing with guns.

Aftermath
OAED administration, informed that immediately after the tragic incident, a group psychologists was sent to support students of the college.

See also 
List of school-related attacks

References 

2009 crimes in Greece
University and college shootings
2000s in Athens
Crime in Athens
April 2009 crimes